Chinna Madam is a 1994 Tamil language drama film directed by Dilip Kumar and produced by R. B. Choudary. The film stars Ramki, Vineetha and Nadhiya. It was released on 15 July 1994.

Plot

Gopal is sentenced to the death penalty for killing his wife Gayathri, and his last wish is meeting the feminist writer Tamilarasi. When Gopal meets Tamilarasi, he tells her about his bitter past.

In the past, Gopal was from a middle-class family and lived with his mother Sharadha and his mentally ill sister Chithra. He fell in love with the rich city girl Gayathri and eventually married her. Gayathri and Gopal started to quarrel about small matters, and Gayathri didn't like the fact that he was not rich. Finally, Gayathri removed her thaali and applied for a divorce. Heartbroken, his mother, Sharadha, died of a heart attack. When Gopal proceeded with his mother's cremation, he became angry, and he ran with a fire torch to Gayathri's house, where he discovered Gayathri being on fire at her house.

After hearing his version of events, Tamilarasi decides to save Gopal at any cost before his execution.

Cast

Ramki as Gopal
Vineetha as Gayathri
Nadhiya as Tamilarasi
Yuvarani as Meera
Vinodhini as Chithra
Livingston as a lawyer
Raja Ravindra as a police officer
C. R. Vijayakumari as Sharadha
Senthil as Alexander
R. Sundarrajan as Gayathri's father
Sathyapriya as Gayathri's mother
Ra. Sankaran as a judge
Latha as Shanthi
Thyagu as Thangarasu, a producer
Pandu as a director
Shanmugasundari
Riyaz Khan as Gopal's friend (uncredited role)
Raghava Lawrence as Special appearance in the song "Kora Kizhangukku"

Soundtrack

The film score and the soundtrack were composed by Sirpy. The soundtrack, released in 1994, features six tracks with lyrics written by Vairamuthu.

Reception
The Indian Express wrote, "The knot had potential, but the script is insipid the treatment listless and the performances in general far from inspiring".

References

1994 films
1990s Tamil-language films
Indian courtroom films
Indian action drama films
1990s action drama films
Super Good Films films